The We the People March was a demonstration in Washington, D.C., in the United States, held on September 21, 2019. While the march had a broad mission statement, participants organized around a number of specific issues, including gun legislation and calls for the impeachment of President Donald Trump. The march was advertised as an event to remind elected officials that they work for the people, its organizer Amy Siskind saying that, "The members of Congress and especially (Speaker of the House) Nancy Pelosi need to feel the pressure to hold the Trump regime accountable. They have failed at that."

The march drew thousands of protestors, including tennis player Martina Navratilova. The crowd marched down Pennsylvania Avenue from a starting point near the Trump International Hotel and ended at the U.S. Capitol.

Siskind, who is well known for publishing The Weekly List, an online chronicle of what she calls the "not normal" events happening under the Trump administration, came up with the idea for the march over the summer after realizing that there was "a broad sense of frustration" among voters following the midterm elections in November 2018. She said that "I got the feeling that people wanted to do something. They wanted to take to the streets and march."

The march took place just three days before House Speaker Nancy Pelosi announced the opening of an impeachment inquiry against Donald Trump.

In addition to the march in Washington, D.C., 65 other solidarity marches took place on the same day across the country.

Cities
Activities were planned in several cities, including:

 Asheville, North Carolina
 Augusta, Maine
 Beaver County, Pennsylvania
 Dunkirk, New York
 Franklin, Massachusetts
 Georgetown, Texas
 Glens Falls, New York
 Huntsville, Alabama
 Kingston, New York
 Long Beach, California
 New Orleans, Louisiana
 Northampton, Massachusetts
 Portland, Oregon
 Rochester, New York
 Silverdale, Washington
 St. Petersburg, Florida
 Washington, D.C.
 Wilmington, Ohio

References

External links

 
 We The People March: Huge protest against Trump hits high gear, Medium (August 22, 2019)

2019 in American politics
2019 protests
Protests in the United States
September 2019 events in the United States